Bahrain Air was an airline of the Kingdom of Bahrain, headquartered in the Mohamed Centre in Muharraq. Its main base was Bahrain International Airport.  The airline flew to 16 destinations in the Middle East, Africa and South Asia. In earlier statements the airline planned to increase its destinations to 23 cities by 2009 and up to 25 cities by 2010. Prior to its voluntary liquidation in 2013, Bahrain Air flew to 17 destinations (flights to Alexandria were seasonal). In 2012, the airline complained via local media about the measures undertaken by the Minister of Transportation, also the competing airline Gulf Air's head of restructuring committee when the airline's route schedule and frequencies were reduced by up to 30% without prior notice.  The airline, having sought every route possible to overcome the Minister's act of Conflict of Interest, declared bankruptcy on 12 February 2013.  The airline complained of conflict of interest.

Bahrain Air started operations on 1 February 2008 as a low-cost airline but changed its operating model to full service by early 2010. The airline was headed in the U.A.E by its Country Manager, Rashid Al Moosa and by its UAE-Sales & Marketing Nicky Bijlaney The inaugural flight occurred on 3 February 2008, from Bahrain to Dubai. The airline used a new Airbus A320 fleet, with 12 seats in business and 150 in economy. The airline had its own in-flight magazine, called Reesha.
Bahrain Air was one of the few airlines which doesn't serve alcoholic beverages on its flights.

Destinations
Bahrain Air used to serve the following destinations (as of December 2012):

Fleet

As of December 2012, the Bahrain Air fleet consisted of the following aircraft, with an average age of 4.5 years:

References

Defunct airlines of Bahrain
Airlines established in 2007
Airlines disestablished in 2013
2013 disestablishments in Bahrain
Bahraini companies established in 2007
Defunct low-cost airlines